Pancreatic elastase is a form of elastase that is produced in the acinar cells of the pancreas, initially produced as an inactive zymogen and later activated in the duodenum by trypsin. Elastases form a subfamily of serine proteases, characterized by a distinctive structure consisting of two beta barrel domains converging at the active site that hydrolyze amides and esters amongst many proteins in addition to elastin, a type of connective tissue that holds organs together. Pancreatic elastase 1 is a serine endopeptidase, a specific type of protease that has the amino acid serine at its active site. Although the recommended name is pancreatic elastase, it can also be referred to as elastase-1, pancreatopeptidase, PE, or serine elastase.

The first isozyme, pancreatic elastase 1, was initially thought to be expressed in the pancreas. However it was later discovered that it was the only chymotrypsin-like elastase that was not expressed in the pancreas. In fact, pancreatic elastase is expressed in basal layers of epidermis (at protein level). Hence pancreatic elastase 1 has been renamed elastase 1 (ELA1) or chymotrypsin-like elastase family, member 1 (CELA1). For a period of time, it was thought that ELA1 / CELA1 was not transcribed into a protein.  However it was later discovered that it was expressed in skin keratinocytes.

Clinical literature that describes human elastase 1 activity in the pancreas or fecal material is actually referring to chymotrypsin-like elastase family, member 3B (CELA3B).

Structure 

Pancreatic elastase is a compact globular protein with a hydrophobic core. This enzyme is formed by three subunits. Each subunit binds one calcium ion (cofactor). There are three important metal-binding sites in amino acids 77, 82, 87. The catalytic triad , located in the active site is formed by three hydrogen-bonded amino acid residues (H71, D119, S214), and plays an essential role in the cleaving ability of all proteases. It is composed of a single peptide chain of 240 amino acids and contains 4 disulfide bridges. It has a high degree of sequence identity with pancreatic elastases that correspond to other species, such as the rat's, with whom it shares 86% of its sequence. Its enzymatic activity is a result of the specific three-dimensional conformation which its single polypeptide chain adopts, and therefore, activity is lost by denaturation and/or conformational changes.

Inhibitors 

Elafin, the skin-derived elastase inhibitor, has been shown to be a potent and specific inhibitor of both the porcine homolog of ELA1 and human leukocyte elastase in vitro. Elafin is expressed by epidermal keratinocytes under hyperproliferative conditions such as psoriasis and wound healing. It has also been reported to be present in many other adult epithelia that are exposed to environmental stimuli: tongue, plate, lingual tonsils, gingiva, pharynx, epiglottis, vocal fold, esophagus, uterine cervix, vagina, and hair follicles. In all these tissues, the presence of inflammatory cells is physiologic and elafin expression is believed to protect against leukocyte proteases, thereby helping to maintain epithelial integrity.

Elafin on the contrary has never been found in the basal layer in any type of epithelial tissue. Indeed, elafin is virtually absent in normal human epidermis. The other known elastase inhibitor, SLPI, however, has been reported to be expressed in the basal keratinocytes suggesting that this may be the major elastase inhibitor in normal epidermis.

Alpha 1-antitrypsin and alpha-2-macroglobulin are human serum protease inhibitors that completely inhibit the general proteolytic activity of pancreatic elastase 1 and 2. It has been observed that a protease must be active in order to bind to these two inhibitors. Studies proved that the activity of elastase 2 was enhanced in 25-250 mM NaCl. The activity of elastase 2 in NaCl approached approximately twice the activity without NaCl.
Elastase 1 is slightly inhibited above 150 mM NaCl

Clinical significance 
Mutations of the CELA1 gene were suspected to be associated with diffuse nonepidermolytic palmoplantar keratoderma (diffuse NEPPK). However the suspected sequence variant was fully functional and did not strongly associate with the disease.  More recently, a specific mutation in the KRT6C gene has been linked to some cases of diffuse NEPPK.

A possible polymorphism of the CELA1 gene coding this protein was found. On a secondary structure level, this polymorphism manifests itself in an excision of a short sequence of CELA1. The disappeared sequence carries the key amino acid residues Val-227 and Thr-239, which contribute to the substrate specificity of elastase I (highlighted in Figure 3), as well as five of the eight amino acids involved in the primary contact of the elafin(inhibitor)/elastase complex formation. These observations imply that the sequence variant might modify the substrate specificity of the enzyme and abolish the inhibitor binding capability. Though there were no obvious pathogenic epidermal abnormalities associated with the truncated ELA1 variant, it is possible that carriers of the polymorphism may be at greater risk of developing the common skin diseases such as psoriasis and eczema (genetic and histologic studies will be required to investigate the role of ELA1 in these common epidermal disorders.).

Biosynthesis 

Pancreatic elastase is formed by activation of proelastase from mammalian pancreas by trypsin. After processing to proelastase, it is stored in the zymogen granules and then activated to elastase in the duodenum by the tryptic cleavage of a peptide bond in the inactive form of the precursor molecule. This process results in the removal of an activation peptide from the N-terminal, that enables the enzyme to adopt its native conformation.

Isozymes 

Humans have five chymotrypsin-like elastase genes which encode the structurally similar proteins:

Post-translational modifications 
Glycosylation at Asn79 and Asn233.

Gene 
The gene that codes for pancreatic elastase 1 is CELA1 (synonym: ELA1)
Pancreatic elastase 1 is encoded by a single genetic locus on chromosome 12. Studies of human pancreatic elastase 1 have shown that this serine protease maps to the chromosomal region 12q13 and it is close to a locus for an autosomal dominant skin disease, Diffuse nonepidermolytic palmoplantar keratoderma.

Reactions 

The hydrolysis that elastases bring about occur in several steps, starting with the formation of a complex between elastase and its substrate, with the carbonyl carbon positioned near the nucleophilic serine, followed by a nucleophillic attack that forms an acyl-enzyme intermediate (a pair of electrons from the double bond of the carbonyl oxygen moves to the oxygen) while the first product is released. The intermediate is then hydrolyzed in a deacylation step, regenerating the active enzyme and resulting in the release of the second product ( the electron-deficient carbonyl carbon re-forms the double bond with the oxygen and the C-terminus of the peptide is released.  It preferentially cleaves peptide bonds at the carbonyl end of amino acid residues with small hydrophobic side chains such as glycine, valine, leucine, isoleucine and alanine. The wide specificity of elastases for non-aromatic uncharged side chains can explain its ability to break down native elastin.

Use in diagnostic tests 

Human pancreatic elastase 1 (E1) remains undegraded during intestinal transit. Therefore, its concentration in feces reflects exocrine pancreatic function. During an inflammation of the pancreas, E1 is released into the bloodstream. Thus the quantification of pancreatic elastase 1 in serum allows diagnosis or exclusion of acute pancreatitis.

Main indications:
 Diagnosis/exclusion of exocrine pancreatic insufficiency caused by e.g. Chronic Pancreatitis, Cystic Fibrosis, Diabetes Mellitus, Cholelithiasis (Gallstones), "Failure to Thrive", Pancreatic Cancer, Papillary Stenosis
 Follow-up monitoring of patients with mild or moderate pancreatic insufficiency
 Diagnosis/exclusion of pancreatic involvement in association with gastrointestinal symptoms, abdominal pain or osteoporosis, for example.
Method of detection:
 Sandwich ELISA with two monoclonal antibodies highly specific for human pancreatic elastase 1
 The ELISA kit is based on a microtiter plate (96 well format) with 12 breakable single strips x 8 wells suitable for up to 42 samples in duplicate
Reference concentration to interpret Pancreatic Elastase results:
For adults and children after the first month of life
 Values > 200 μg elastase/g stool indicate normal exocrine pancreatic function
 Values of 100-200 μg elastase/g stool suggest mild to moderate pancreatic insuffiency
 Values < 100 μg elastase/g stool indicate exocrine pancreatic insufficiency.

References

External links
 
 

EC 3.4.21
Gastroenterology
Clinical pathology